Arkansas Highway 242 (AR 242, Hwy. 242) is an east–west state highway in Phillips County, Arkansas. The route of  runs from Highway 44 near Helena-West Helena north through the city and through the St. Francis National Forest to Highway 1 near Lexa. A segment of the route is part of the Mississippi River Trail, essentially a bicycle-friendly version of the Great River Road.

Route description
AR 242 begins at AR 1 west of Lexa and heads east through town as 1st Street. It crosses over Lick Creek and passes by Thompson-Robbins Airport. The route then intersects its only spur route near the St. Francis National Forest before turning to the southeast. The route then intersects AR 185 before entering West Helena. It then goes southeast on Sebastian Street, running concurrent with another route of AR 185 until reaching South 7th on Russell. The route then intersects another route of AR 185 by the Helena Country Club and then intersects US 49 (Martin Luther King Jr. Drive), a four-lane divided highway, at an at-grade intersection in the south part of the city. The highway then turns to the southwest and reaches its eastern terminus at AR 44.

Beginning from the end of the Highway 1 to the US 49B concurrency, the route is designated as part of the Mississippi River Trail, a  bike route from New Orleans to Minnesota along the Mississippi River.

Major intersections
Mile markers reset at concurrencies.

Spur route

Arkansas Highway 242 Spur (AR 242S, Hwy. 242S, or Storm Creek Road) is a spur route in the St. Francis National Forest.

See also

References

External links

 Images of Arkansas Highway 242

242
Transportation in Phillips County, Arkansas